South Huntingdon Township is a township in Westmoreland County, Pennsylvania, United States. The population was 5,412 at the 2020 census.

History
The Bells Mills Covered Bridge was listed on the National Register of Historic Places in 1980.

Geography
According to the United States Census Bureau, the township has a total area of 45.7 square miles (118.4 km2), of which 45.3 square miles (117.3 km2)  is land and 0.4 square mile (1.2 km2)  (0.98%) is water.

Demographics

As of the census of 2000, there were 6,175 people, 2,461 households, and 1,840 families living in the township.  The population density was 136.4 people per square mile (52.7/km2).  There were 2,585 housing units at an average density of 57.1/sq mi (22.0/km2).  The racial makeup of the township was 98.02% White, 0.91% African American, 0.11% Native American, 0.08% Asian, 0.02% Pacific Islander, 0.06% from other races, and 0.79% from two or more races. Hispanic or Latino of any race were 0.37% of the population.

There were 2,461 households, out of which 28.9% had children under the age of 18 living with them, 61.4% were married couples living together, 9.3% had a female householder with no husband present, and 25.2% were non-families. 21.9% of all households were made up of individuals, and 11.6% had someone living alone who was 65 years of age or older.  The average household size was 2.51 and the average family size was 2.91.

In the township the population was spread out, with 21.4% under the age of 18, 6.8% from 18 to 24, 29.1% from 25 to 44, 25.9% from 45 to 64, and 16.8% who were 65 years of age or older.  The median age was 41 years. For every 100 females there were 96.9 males.  For every 100 females age 18 and over, there were 96.1 males.

The median income for a household in the township was $35,431, and the median income for a family was $39,529. Males had a median income of $31,728 versus $23,033 for females. The per capita income for the township was $17,645.  About 4.7% of families and 7.1% of the population were below the poverty line, including 5.8% of those under age 18 and 9.4% of those age 65 or over.

References

Townships in Westmoreland County, Pennsylvania